The list of cathedrals in Hong Kong, sorted by denominations, is as follows:


Roman Catholicism 
 Cathedral of the Immaculate Conception, Mid-Levels

Anglicanism 
 Cathedral Church of Saint John the Evangelist, Central
 Holy Trinity Cathedral, Kowloon City
 All Saints' Cathedral, Mong Kok

Eastern Orthodoxy 
 Apostle and Evangelist Luke Cathedral of Hong Kong, Central

See also 
 List of cathedrals
 Christianity in Hong Kong

References 

Christianity in Hong Kong
Cathedrals
Religious buildings and structures in Hong Kong
Cathedrals, Hong Kong